Colonel Robert Uniacke-FitzGerald (17 March 1751 – 20 December 1814) was an Irish politician.

He was the eldest son of Robert Uniacke (afterwards Fitzgerald) of Corkbeg and descended from the Munster Desmond FitzGerald Knights of Glin and Kerry, through Sir Garrett FitzGerald Knt of Lisquinlan and Sir Robert Tynte of Youghal and Ballycrenane. His younger brother was the infamous 1798 United Irish Rebellion Tipperary High Sheriff Col Sir Thomas Judkin-Fitzgerald, 1st Baronet of Lisheen, Co Tipperary. He was educated in the law at the Middle Temple.

Uniacke-FitzGerald was among the last surviving Members of the Parliament of Ireland, where he represented Cork County with his cousin Henry Boyle, 3rd Earl of Shannon from 1798 until its extinction in 1800. He was appointed Clerk of the Ordnance in 1799, and Surveyor-General in 1801.

After the Act of Union in 1801 he represented Cork County in the new Parliament of the United Kingdom until 24 October 1806. He was Colonel of the North Cork militia from 1798 to 1807 and Governor of Cork in 1805.

He married Louisa, the daughter of Rev. Richard Bullen of Rostellane, co. Cork, with whom he had a son and ten daughters. His descendants included Sir Robert Uniacke-Penrose-Fitzgerald, 1st Baronet of Corkbeg and Lisquinlan.

Ancestry

References 

 

1771 births
1842 deaths
Irish MPs 1798–1800
Members of the Parliament of the United Kingdom for County Cork constituencies (1801–1922)
UK MPs 1801–1802
UK MPs 1802–1806
UK MPs 1806–1807
Members of the Parliament of Ireland (pre-1801) for County Cork constituencies